Annemarie Jorritsma-Lebbink (born 1 June 1950) is a Dutch politician of the People's Party for Freedom and Democracy (VVD) and businesswoman. She is the Parliamentary leader in the Senate since 24 November 2015 and a Member of the Senate since 9 June 2015.

Life and career
Jorritsma attended the Baudartius College in Zutphen from April 1964 until May 1970 obtaining a Bachelor of Liberal Arts degree. Jorritsma served on the Municipal Council of Bolsward from 5 September 1978 until 1988.

Jorritsma was elected as a Member of the House of Representatives after the election of 1982, serving from 16 September 1982 until 3 June 1986. Jorritsma returned as a Member of the House of Representatives after Wim van Eekelen was appointed Minister of Defence in the Cabinet Lubbers II after the election of 1986, taking office on 30 July 1986 serving as a frontbencher and spokesperson for Spatial Planning. After the election of 1994 Jorritsma was appointed as Minister of Transport and Water Management in the Cabinet Kok I, taking office on 22 August 1994. After the election of 1998 Jorritsma returned as a Member of the House of Representatives, taking office on 19 May 1998. Following the cabinet formation of 1998 Jorritsma was appointment as Deputy Prime Minister and Minister of Economic Affairs in the Cabinet Kok II, taking office on 3 August 1998. The Cabinet Kok II resigned on 16 April 2002 following the conclusions of the NIOD report into the Srebrenica massacre during the Bosnian War and continued to serve in a demissionary capacity. After the election of 2002 Jorritsma again returned as a Member of the House of Representatives, taking office on 23 May 2002. Following the cabinet formation of 2002 Jorritsma was not giving a cabinet post in the new cabinet, the Cabinet Kok II was replaced by the Cabinet Balkenende I on 22 July 2002 and he continued to serve in the House of Representatives as a frontbencher and spokesperson for Social Affairs and Employment. In October 2002 Jorritsma announced that she wouldn't stand for the election of 2003 and continued to serve until the end of the parliamentary term on 30 January 2003.

Jorritsma remained in active in national politics, in February 2003 she was appointed as acting Mayor of Delfzijl, taking office on 11 February 2003. In August 2003 she was nominated as Mayor of Almere, she resigned as acting Mayor of Delfzijl the same day she was installed as Mayor of Almere, serving from 16 August 2003 until 9 September 2015. Jorritsma also became active in the private sector and public sector and occupied numerous seats as a corporate director and nonprofit director on several boards of directors and supervisory boards (PricewaterhouseCoopers, Equens, Alliander, Association of Participation Companies and Recruit Global Staffing). Jorritsma also served as Chairwoman of the executive board of the Association of Municipalities from 1 May 2008 until 3 June 2015. Jorritsma was elected as a Member of the Senate after the Senate election of 2015, taking office on 9 June 2015 serving as a frontbencher and spokesperson for Infrastructure and Water Management. Jorritsma was selected as Parliamentary leader of the People's Party for Freedom and Democracy in the Senate following the resignation of Loek Hermans, taking office on 24 November 2015.

Decorations

References

External links

Official
  A. (Annemarie) Jorritsma-Lebbink Parlement.com
  A. Jorritsma-Lebbink (VVD) Eerste Kamer der Staten-Generaal

 

 

1950 births
Living people
Commanders of the Order of Orange-Nassau
Deputy Prime Ministers of the Netherlands
Dutch corporate directors
Dutch Mennonites
Dutch nonprofit directors
Dutch nonprofit executives
Dutch trade association executives
20th-century Dutch businesswomen
20th-century Dutch businesspeople
Grand Officers of the Order of Leopold II
Knights Commander of the Order of Merit of the Federal Republic of Germany
Mayors in Groningen (province)
Mayors of Almere
Members of the House of Representatives (Netherlands)
Members of the Senate (Netherlands)
Ministers of Economic Affairs of the Netherlands
Ministers of Transport and Water Management of the Netherlands
Municipal councillors in Friesland
People from Bolsward
People from Bronckhorst
People from Delfzijl
People's Party for Freedom and Democracy politicians
Women government ministers of the Netherlands
Women mayors of places in the Netherlands
20th-century Dutch civil servants
20th-century Dutch women politicians
20th-century Dutch politicians
21st-century Dutch businesswomen
21st-century Dutch businesspeople
21st-century Dutch civil servants
21st-century Dutch women politicians
21st-century Dutch politicians